Orders, decorations, and medals of Bosnia and Herzegovina are social and public recognition, which are awarded for special contribution in realization of human rights and freedom, for construction of democratic relations, peace and stabilization, development of International cooperation of Bosnia and Herzegovina with other countries and with International organizations and for cultural, economic and every other progress of people and citizens of Bosnia and Herzegovina. The system of honours of Bosnia and Herzegovina was established after the Croat–Bosniak War ended in 1994, and changed in May 2003.

All citizens of Bosnia and Herzegovina, economic societies, state institutions and other legal entities and non-government organizations are suitable to receive decorations of Bosnia and Herzegovina. Also, foreign citizens, foreign and International organizations and institutions are suitable. It is possible to receive a decoration post mortem.

The only authorized institution for bestowal of orders, decorations and medals of Bosnia and Herzegovina is the Presidency of Bosnia and Herzegovina.

Current decorations
 Order of Freedom
Order of Peace
Order of Bosnia and Herzegovina
 Order of the Gold Coat of Arms of Bosnia and Herzegovina with Swords
 Order of the Gold Coat of Arms of Bosnia and Herzegovina with Sash
Order of Bosnia and Herzegovina with Golden Wreath
Order of Bosnia and Herzegovina with Silver Wreath
 Order of the Silver Coat of Arms of Bosnia and Herzegovina with Swords

Former decorations (1994–2003)

Orders
 Order of the Golden Lily 1st Class
 Order of the Golden Lily 2nd Class
 Order of the Golden Lily 3rd Class
 Order of Freedom
 Order of the Hero of the Liberation War
Order of Peace
Order of the Republic
Order of the Liberation
 Order of the Gold Coat of Arms with Swords
 Order of Military Merit 1st class
 Order of Military Merit 2nd class
Order of Kulin Ban
Order of the Dragon of Bosnia
Order of the Bosnian Coat of Arms

Medals
Medal of the Republic
Medal of Victory
 Bravery Medal
Medal of Labour and Enterprise
 Medal of Military Merit
Exemplary Fighter Medal
Medal of Merit

References

 Zakon o odlikovanjima Bosne i Hercegovine made on May 21, 2003.
Orders, Decorations and Medals of Bosnia-Herzegovina
ODLIKOVANJA DODIJELJENA ZA ODBRANU REPUBLIKE BOSNE I HERCEGOVINE